Sarvam Thaala Mayam is a 2019 Indian Tamil-language musical drama film written and directed by Rajiv Menon. The film stars G. V. Prakash Kumar and Aparna Balamurali, with a supporting cast including Nedumudi Venu, Vineeth, Kumaravel, Santha Dhananjayan, and Dhivyadharshini. The film has music composed by A. R. Rahman, cinematography by Ravi Yadav, and editing by Anthony.

Returning to direction after 19 years, Menon makes a comeback with a film that is relevant, entertaining, and inspirational in parts. The film released on 1 February 2019. The film was a box office success.

Plot 

This is a story about a famous mridangam player named Vembu Iyer and his student Peter Johnson, son of an expert mridangam maker named Johnson and a crazy Vijay fan, collide.

Earlier Peter is a care-free brat who neither has any interest in his father's mridangam making business nor in his own career. He starts wooing a nurse called Saara who keeps some distance from him due to his approach. Then one day, on his father's insistence he goes to deliver mridangam to Vembu Iyer's concert where he is allowed to watch his program. After observing Iyer's concert, Peter starts admiring him and decides to join as a student to learn mridangam from him.

After observing Peter, Iyer understands that he has talent but rejects him due to his lack of discipline and consistency. To prove Iyer wrong, Peter tries hard to change himself which constoned by his mother and worried about his future. Finally Iyer allows Peter as his student.

Peter is mistreated by Iyer's assistant Mani because of his lower caste. This is noticed by Iyer, who warns Mani to be good with his students. Mani confesses his dissatisfaction over Iyer, saying he did not support his career as a mridangam player and used him. This angers Iyer, who sacks him from the job in front of Peter, so Mani swears revenge on Iyer and Peter for his humiliation.

Peter becomes good friends with Nandagopal 'Nandu', a NRI and a Harvard University PhD dropout who came to learn mridangam from Iyer. Meanwhile, Mani joins as a judge in a classical music instrument reality show called 'Sangeetha Samrat' with the help of his younger sister Anjana who is a crooked socialite and works as a VJ. Peter is very passionate about the beats of mridangam and becomes one of the favourite students of Iyer. Meanwhile, Saara realizes her love for Peter and they start dating.

Anjana sets a trap to humiliate Iyer. She invites Nandu to perform on her reality show and makes him believe that it was telecasted only in the USA. Nandu comes along with Peter, who consistently warns him to not perform without their teacher's permission. After knowing that it was a trap to humiliate them, Nandu leaves the place without any warning to Peter. Without knowing the facts, Peter enters the studio to find Nandu, but he is focused on "live". Then with no option left, Peter gets ready to play mridangam which gets severely humiliated by Mani and Anjana, making him seem useless and directly criticize Iyer. After learning of this, Iyer questions Peter on why he went to perform on the stage. Peter takes the blame on himself to save Nandu. The angered Iyer sends Peter away saying that it is a real humiliation for his musical knowledge for believing in such a useless student.

Later at Nandu's home, Nandu blames Peter for his mistakes and Peter challenges Nandu saying that he will be overpowered by him one day. After these events, Peter became depressed and started taking drugs, which worries his parents. This is noticed by Saara who takes him to her home. Later she makes him realise that the music is everywhere and built in nature and encourages him to explore the world to learn Thaalam (beats). Inspired by these words, Peter starts a journey on his own way to learn different types of beat instruments.

Meanwhile, the Sangeetha Samrat show becomes successful after completion of 2 successful seasons and all of Iyer's students including Nandu are fascinated over the popularity and leave him. Finally Iyer understands that he needs to mend his ways according to the world or else he cannot transfer his musical knowledge to the further generations. He realizes that Peter is his heir for his knowledge of music and calls him back.

Peter happily joins him back to continue learn mridangam to win the show and gain his teacher's respect back. Meanwhile, Nandu joins hands with Mani and started taking training from him to win the show. After learining that Iyer is also showing interest in this show and that Peter is also participating in this show, the duo become cautious. However Peter and Nandu managed to reach the finals in the program. Before starting the show, Peter forgets the beats that Iyer had taught him but surprisingly these are answered by Nandu to Iyer. Then Mani comes in front of them and challenges Iyer. He says that he will prove that he is a better teacher than Iyer and will humiliate both Iyer and Peter in front of everyone as revenge for his humiliation. This is why he has trained Nandu well in all of Iyer's compositions to counter them. After  hearing this Iyer advises Peter to stay on the same strategy.

In the show while countering Nandu, Peter remembers different beats of instrumental music that he has learned from the world and applies all the beats in the mridangam which gives joy to the audience. With no option left, Mani decides to declare Peter as the winner in the show which constoned by Nandu. Later Iyer leaves the stage which makes Peter afraid that his teacher is angry with him for not following his strategy. But Iyer feels proud of him and happily claims Peter as his student. The film ends with Peter, now a celebrity, performing along with his teacher Iyer.

Cast 

 G. V. Prakash Kumar as Peter Johnson
 Nedumudi Venu as Vembhu Iyer
 Aparna Balamurali as Sara (Saramma)
 Dhivyadharshini as Anjana
 Vineeth as Mani
 Kumaravel as Johnson
 Ravi Prakash as Krish Gopalakrishnan, Nandu's father
 Sumesh S. Narayanan as Nandagopal ('Nandu')
 Aadhira Pandilakshmi as Theresa Johnson
 Santha Dhananjayan as Abhirami
 Sikkil Gurucharan as Vedaraman 
 Director Marimuthu as Police Officer
 Srinivas Moorthy as Thupakki Thyagu
 Raj Kamal as Hari
 Spike John as Velu
 Krish Haran as Kumar
 Bala Singh as Gokul Raj

Guest appearances
 Sandy  as himself
 Unni Krishnan as himself
 Srinivas as himself
 Karthik as himself
 Bombay Jayashri as herself

Production 
In March 2016, it was widely reported in the media that Rajiv Menon would begin work on his third directorial venture, after he had taken a sabbatical from the profession following the release of his previous film, Kandukondain Kandukondain (2000). Titled Sarvam Thaala Mayam, G. V. Prakash Kumar was signed on to play the lead role of a percussionist in the film, while A. R. Rahman was selected to compose the film's music. Pre-production work took place in mid-2016, and the team finalised Sai Pallavi to play the female lead role. Other actors including Nedumudi Venu and Cheenu Mohan were also approached to play key roles in the film, but production failed to take off in November 2016 as planned and the project was delayed.

In March 2017, Menon denied that the film was dropped and noted that a promotional photo shoot with Prakash Kumar was imminent. Prakash Kumar revealed that the story was set in two states and was inspired by incidents from the lives of real musicians. During the period, Prakash Kumar also took professional mridangam lessons from percussionist Umayalpuram Sivaraman to equip himself for the character. After further brief delays, the film was officially launched on 29 November 2017 and the shoot began thereafter. Sai Pallavi's unavailability meant that the team replaced her with Aparna Balamurali, after Menon was impressed with her performance in the Malayalam film, Maheshinte Prathikaaram (2016), and called her for a successful audition. An ensemble cast of Nedumudi Venu, Santha Dhananjayan, Vineeth, Kumaravel, Sumesh and Athira was also announced with the launch, while Ravi Yadav and Anthony were confirmed as the film's cinematographer and editor respectively. Actress Dhivyadharshini also later joined the film during the first schedule, which carried on until the end of 2017.

Music

References

External links

 Sarvam Thala Mayam Official Merchandise by Fully Filmy

2010s Tamil-language films
A. R. Rahman soundtracks
Films about music and musicians
Films scored by A. R. Rahman
Films shot in Chennai
Indian musical drama films
2010s musical drama films
2019 films
2019 drama films